Sew Hoy & Sons Ltd (in liq and in rec) v Coopers & Lybrand [1996] 1 NZLR 392 is a cited case regarding causation.

Background
Sew Hoy & Sons Ltd was placed into receivership, and the receivers later discovered that the auditors Coopers and Lybrand had missed that the stock had been overvalued in its reports.

As result, the receivers argued that the auditors not detecting this, prevented the company from taking considering options such as taking "mitigating steps", or ceasing trading.

The receivers sued the auditors.

Held
The court dismissed the claim, as the plaintiff had not established causation for the loss.

References

New Zealand tort case law
1995 in New Zealand law